Hornby is a village and civil parish in the Hambleton district of North Yorkshire, England. It lies on a minor road between Great Smeaton and Appleton Wiske.

According to the 2001 census, Hornby had a population of 206, which increased in the 2011 census to 238. The village has very few amenities. There is a small church, a telephone box and a post box.

The village pub is called the "Grange Arms".

Etymology
The name of the village is first attested in the Domesday Book of 1086 as Horenbodebi and in 1088 in the Durham Liber Vitae as Hornbotebi. The final element comes from the Old Norse word bý ('settlement'). The origin of the first part of the name is less certain, but thought to come from a lost Old Norse personal name Hornbǫði. Thus the name once meant 'Hornbǫði's farm'. The modern form was perhaps influenced by the nearby Hornby, Richmondshire.

References

External links

Villages in North Yorkshire
Civil parishes in North Yorkshire